Burns Arena is a multi-purpose arena in St. George, Utah.  It is the home of the Utah Tech Trailblazers basketball teams.  The capacity of the arena is 5,000 people.  It is located near Bruce Hurst Field and Greater Zion Stadium.  There are 4,779 permanent seats at Burns Arena in 14 sections.  It was built in 1987 as the Dixie Center.  By the time the current incarnation of Dixie Center opened in 1998, the arena took its present name. It is named after M. Anthony Burns.

It is also the site of the Buck-A-Thon and the World Senior Games. Many concerts, high school tournaments, and boxing matches also take place in this facility.

During the 2020 -2021 pandemic, the University of New Mexico's men's basketball team temporarily relocated to the Burns Arena in January 2021 due to pandemic restrictions in New Mexico. The Lobos played three games in Burns Arena, beating Dixie State 72-63, and then splitting a pair of game with San Jose State.

In 2006, UNLV played a home game against Northern Arizona in the Burns Arena. The Rebels won 93-53.

On October 13, 1988, the Utah Jazz defeated the Indiana Pacers, 104-95, in a pre-season game played at the Burns Arena. Karl Malone scored 27 points and John Stockton added 18 points and 11 assists to lead the Jazz. Chuck Person had 22 points for the Pacers.

The arena is located on 400 South and 700 East in St. George.

References

Basketball venues in Utah
College basketball venues in the United States
Utah Tech Trailblazers basketball
Sports venues in Washington County, Utah
Buildings and structures in St. George, Utah